Fort Confidence, located at the mouth of the Dease River on the eastern tip of the Dease Arm of Great Bear Lake, Northwest Territories, was a Hudson's Bay Company establishment (not a trading post), built in 1837 by Peter Warren Dease and Thomas Simpson as a base for their exploration of the Arctic coast. It served as a quarters for two winters. The structure was a log building, and burned down a short time later. In 1848, the post was rebuilt by John Bell and used by Sir John Richardson and Dr. John Rae as a base of operations during the search for famous explorer Sir John Franklin, who went missing along the Arctic Coast. These buildings were still standing in 1902, but had again been destroyed by fire by 1911 when George M. Douglas's expedition to the Coppermine River passed through the area. The remains of this fort consist of four stone and clay chimneys.

Fort Confidence was featured in Jules Verne's book The Fur Country.

Photo gallery

External links
Fort Confidence at the Prince of Wales Northern Heritage Centre
The Great Bear Lake: Its Place in History
Chapter 8 of The Fur Country
CHAPTER IX. Transactions at Fort Confidence^ winter 1837–8. — Death of Peter Taylor, — Winter Discoveries and Surveys. from Narrative of the Discoveries on the North Coast of America, effected by the Officers of the Hudson’s Bay Company, during the years 1836—39 by Thomas Simpson

Hudson's Bay Company forts
Ghost towns in the Northwest Territories
Buildings and structures in the Northwest Territories
Confidence
Former populated places in the Sahtu Region
1837 establishments in Canada